Kathrynne Ann Whitworth (September 27, 1939 – December 24, 2022) was an American professional golfer. During her playing career she won 88 LPGA Tour tournaments, more than anyone else on the LPGA or PGA Tours. Whitworth was also a runner-up 93 times, giving her 181 top-two finishes. In 1981, she became the first woman to reach career earnings of $1 million on the LPGA Tour. She is a member of the World Golf Hall of Fame.

Early life and amateur career
Whitworth was born on September 27, 1939, in Monahans, Texas, the youngest of three daughters of Morris Whitworth, a hardware store owner and later mayor in Jal, New Mexico, where she grew up. She attended Odessa College.

Initially a tennis player, Whitworth began playing golf at 14. After working with Hardy Loudermilk, she won the 1957 and 1958 New Mexico State Amateur Championships. At 19, she changed coaches to Harvey Penick and turned pro, joining the LPGA in December 1958.

Professional career
In 1962, Whitworth won her first tournament, the Kelly Girls Open. Between that and her victory in the United Virginia Bank Classic in 1985, she won 88 tournaments on the LPGA Tour, the highest number of any player, including on the men's PGA Tour. Six were major championships. In 1974, she won the Orange Blossom Classic for the fifth time, one of only four LPGA golfers have won the same tournament five times. She was the U.S. team captain at the inaugural Solheim Cup match in 1990. She was the first LPGA player to earn $1 million, in 1981.

Whitworth was LPGA Player of the Year seven times between 1966 and 1973, won the Vare Trophy for best scoring average by an LPGA Tour player a record seven times between 1965 and 1972, and was inducted into the LPGA Hall of Fame in 1975 and into the World Golf Hall of Fame in 1982. She was named Associated Press Female Athlete of the Year in 1965 and 1967. She was Named "Golfer of the Decade" by Golf Magazine for the years 1968 to 1977 during the 1988 Centennial of Golf in America celebration. She received the 1986 William Richardson Award from the Golf Writers Association of America for consistent outstanding contributions to golf. She is also a member of the New Mexico Hall of Fame, Texas Sports Hall of Fame, Texas Golf Hall of Fame, and the Women's Sports Foundation Hall of Fame.

Later life and death
Whitworth retired from competitive golf in 2005 after competing in the BJ's Charity Classic on the Women's Senior Golf Tour. In 2007, with Jay Golden, she published Kathy Whitworth's Little Book of Golf Wisdom. At the time of her death she lived in Flower Mound, Texas with her partner, Bettye Odle. She died in Flower Mound on December 24, 2022, at age 83, after collapsing while attending a neighbor's Christmas party.

Professional wins

LPGA Tour wins (88)

 
Note: Whitworth won the Colgate-Dinah Shore Winner's Circle (now known as the ANA Inspiration) before it became a major championship.

LPGA Tour playoff record (8–20)

Ladies European Tour wins
1984 Smirnoff Ladies Irish Open

Other wins
1962 Haig & Haig Scotch Foursome (with Mason Rudolph)
1966 Lagunita Invitational
1967 Ladies World Series of Golf
1968 Ladies World Series of Golf
1971 LPGA Four-Ball Championship (with Judy Kimball)
1975 Colgate Triple Crown
1978 Ping Classic Team Championship (with Donna Caponi)
1980 Portland Ping Team Championship (with Donna Caponi)
1981 Portland Ping Team Championship (with Donna Caponi)

Major championships

Wins (6)

See also
List of golfers with most LPGA Tour wins
List of golfers with most LPGA major championship wins

References

External links 

American female golfers
LPGA Tour golfers
Winners of LPGA major golf championships
World Golf Hall of Fame inductees
Golfers from Texas
Golfers from New Mexico
American LGBT sportspeople
LGBT golfers
LGBT people from Texas
People from Monahans, Texas
People from Lea County, New Mexico
People from Flower Mound, Texas
1939 births
2022 deaths
20th-century American LGBT people
21st-century American LGBT people